Gabriele von Lutzau (née Dillmann; born 15 August 1954) is a German heroine and sculptor. She is remembered as the "Angel of Mogadishu" for her role in a notorious hijacking, and is also noted for her abstract beechwood sculptures. She is by marriage a member of the Russian-German Lutzau family who was ennobled in Imperial Russia.

Mogadishu hijacking
Gabriele Dillmann worked as a flight attendant for Lufthansa. In 1977 she was serving on Lufthansa Flight 181 when it was hijacked by Palestinian terrorists. During the ensuing protracted captivity, she was a pillar of support and hope for the other hostages, and was lionized by the German press. She was awarded the Order of Merit of the Federal Republic of Germany for her role in the affair. She later married her fiance, Lufthansa pilot Rüdiger von Lutzau, who piloted the plane carrying the commandos of the rescue force.

Peter H. Jamin has made a short film Der Engel von Mogadischu (The Angel of Mogadishu) about Lutzau, covering both her role in the hijacking and her later life as an artist.

Artistic career
From 1984 to 1995, Lutzau studied art under Walther Piesch at the art school of the University of Strasbourg.

Her works are mainly "guardian figures" carved in wood, most made out of beechwood, but some also from black locust. Among her sculpting tools are the chainsaw and the flamethrower. She describes her work as "sentinels, wings, and life signs" crafted from "discarded wood - unwanted, sometimes grown under hard conditions - gnarled and twisted and finally felled." Although her original work is always in wood, she often has her sculptures cast into bronze or steel. For her "guardians" and "life signs", she also uses thuja trees, often called the "tree of life", as they are often planted on graves.

Lutzau has exhibited at the ALP Galleries in New York City (a gallery dedicated to German artists), in Shanghai (Shanghai Spring Art Salon 2003), and at many galleries and shows in Germany.

Since 11 September 2001, Lutzau has coloured her guardian figures black (they had previously been blue).

Lutzau is a member of the German Federal Association of Visual Artists (BBK). In 1997 she was awarded the Aisch Art Prize of the Art Association of Höchstadt, and was a jury member for the Federal Office for Building and Regional Planning in Berlin in 2002 and for the BBK in Frankfurt in 2003. She now lives and works in Michelstadt in the Odenwald.

References

External links
Gabriele von Lutzau's website 
 (Article about the Mogadishu hijacking, including statements from Gabriele von Lutzau.)

1954 births
Living people
People from Wolfsburg
People from Michelstadt
Flight attendants
German people taken hostage
Hijacking survivors
Recipients of the Cross of the Order of Merit of the Federal Republic of Germany
German sculptors
University of Strasbourg alumni
Lufthansa people